The following is a list of persons from Spanish-speaking countries or of Hispanic descent who have travelled into space, sorted by date of first flight.

The first country listed is that of citizenship; the second, if any, is that of the Spanish-speaking country of birth or ancestry.

Orbital

Suborbital

Other Hispanic astronauts

See also
List of Ibero-American spacefarers

References 

Hispanic and Latino
Hispanic